National Aviation University is a station on the Kyiv Light Rail. It was opened in 1977, beside the National Aviation University, and upgraded in 2010.

External links
 

Kyiv Light Rail stations